Miloš Vasić (born 10 January 1991) is a Serbian rower. He represented Serbia at the 2012 and 2016 Summer Olympics. He competed at the 2020 Summer Olympics in the men's coxless pair together with Martin Mačković and placed fifth.

He currently lives in Belgrade. He is a member of Rowing club Partizan.

Results

Olympic games
 2012 – Coxless four – 10th place
 2016 – Coxless pair – 10th

World Championships
 2011 – Coxless four – 11th place
 2013 – Coxless four – 11th
 2014 – Coxless four – 9th
 2015 – Coxless pair – 
 2017 – Coxless pair – 6th
 2018 – Coxless pair – 9th
 2019 – Coxless pair – 7th

European Championships
 2010 – Coxless four – 6th place
 2011 – Coxless four – 6th
 2012 – Coxless four – 
 2013 – Coxless four – 7th
 2014 – Single sculls – 11th
 2015 – Coxless pair – 
 2016 – Coxless pair – 5th
 2017 – Coxless pair – 
 2018 – Coxless pair – 4th
 2019 – Coxless pair – 6th
 2021 – Coxless pair –

World U23 Championships
 2013 – Coxless pair –

World Junior Championships
 2008 – Coxed four – 5th place
 2009 – Single sculls – 6th

Personal life 
In July 2019, Vasić married Sonja Petrović, a professional basketball player and European champion and Olympic medalist with the Serbian national team.

References

External links

1991 births
Living people
Serbian male rowers
Olympic rowers of Serbia
Rowers at the 2012 Summer Olympics
Rowers at the 2016 Summer Olympics
Sportspeople from Loznica
World Rowing Championships medalists for Serbia
European Rowing Championships medalists
Rowers at the 2020 Summer Olympics